Sunnyvale School District may refer to:

 Sunnyvale Independent School District in Sunnyvale, Texas
 Sunnyvale School District (California) in Sunnyvale, California